Jomon Kuriakose, also known as Chef Jomon, is the Executive Chef at LaLiT London, England making him one of the youngest executive chefs in London. He was previously the Chef de Cusine at LaLiT London. senior Chef de Partie and then Sous-chef under Vivek Singh (chef) at the Cinnamon Collections in London. He has also participated in MasterChef (British TV series) 2018 where he trained Spencer Matthews and Frankie Bridge.

He was a competitor on  the National Chef of the Year, 2021 and also writes regularly for Malayala Manorama Online.

Early life and education 
Born and raised in Mavelikkara, Kerala, India, Jomon completed a Bachelor’s Degree in Hotel Management from Sarosh Institute of Hotel Administration under Mangalore University. After graduation, Jomon joined Speciality Restaurant Pvt Ltd and later in 2008, he moved to London and took up the role of Chef de Partie.   Bombay Palace, where he specialised in authentic Indian cuisine and developed his skills in fine Anglo-Indian dining. He joined Baluchi at the Lalit London as Chef de Cuisine in 2017.

Awards and recognition

 He was recognised as a culinary hero (2021) by the Craft Guild of Chefs
 100 most influential Malayalis in the UK
 The news person of the year 2019, British Malayali

References

Further reading 
Podcast https://music.amazon.com/podcasts/b7439a05-c050-491c-8a7f-23afe2373007/episodes/8a46f101-bb60-4919-a73e-56e2ce5e125d/aanakaryam-chenakaryam-in-conversation-with-chef-jomon

External links 
 

Living people
Indian television chefs
Businesspeople from Kerala
Year of birth missing (living people)